Hans-Joachim "Hansi" Göring (27 December 1923 – 11 April 2010) was an East German footballer, coach and teacher. He played for BSG Turbine Weimar in the DDR-Liga. After his career, he studied sports and taught for 26 years in Erfurt. He also was a skilled decorator. He was married and had three children.

References
 Obituary
 

1923 births
2010 deaths
German footballers
East German footballers
German footballers needing infoboxes
Association football midfielders